Treetop Walk or Tree Top Walk may refer to:

 Canopy walkway, a structure allowing pedestrian access to a forest canopy
 Tree Top Walk at the Walpole-Nornalup National Park, Western Australia
 HSBC TreeTop Walk at the Central Catchment Nature Reserve, Singapore
 Tahune Airwalk, Huon Valley, Tasmania
 Treetop walkway at Royal Botanic Gardens, Kew, England
 West Coast Treetop Walk near Hokitika, New Zealand